Kunstverein Arnsberg is an Association for Contemporary Art established in 1987 and located in Arnsberg, Germany.

Building

The  rooms of the Art Association are on the first floor of a neoclassical-style house at the central Neumarkt, designed by Karl Schinkel, whose basic structure is almost preserved. This historically listed building   was built around 1820 for the judicial magistrate, Franz Friedrich Bernhard Hoeynck. The house formerly belongs to a large garden with a listed garden shed. The   basic structure is almost totally preserved.

Exhibitions and projects

References

External links 
 Official Website of Kunstvereins Arnsberg

Arnsberg
Arts organisations based in Germany
German contemporary art
1987 establishments in Germany
Arts organizations established in 1987